The  Asian Men's Volleyball Championship was the ninth staging of the Asian Men's Volleyball Championship, a biennial international volleyball tournament organised by the Asian Volleyball Confederation (AVC) with Qatar Volleyball Association (QVA). The tournament was held in Doha, Qatar from 3 to 11 September 1997.

Pools composition
The teams are seeded based on their final ranking at the 1995 Asian Men's Volleyball Championship.

Preliminary round 

Pool A

|}

Pool B

|}

|}

Pool C

|}

Pool D

|}

|}

Quarterfinals 
 The results and the points of the matches between the same teams that were already played during the preliminary round shall be taken into account for the Quarterfinals.

Pool E

|}

|}

Pool F

|}

|}

Pool G

|}

Pool H

|}

Final round
 The results and the points of the matches between the same teams that were already played during the previous rounds shall be taken into account for the final round.

 Classification 9th–12th 

|}

|}

 Classification 5th–8th 

|}

|}

Championship

|}

|}

Final standing

References

Results

A
V
International volleyball competitions hosted by Qatar
Asian men's volleyball championships